Christ's sake may refer to:

Christ's sake, a colloquial phrase used as a profanity
Christ's Sake, American Christian rock band

See also
For Christ's Sake (disambiguation)